185th Aviation Regiment is an aviation regiment of the United States Army.

Structure

 1st Battalion
 Headquarters and Headquarters Company
 Detachment 2 at Army Aviation Support Facility #1, Barrow County Airport (GA ARNG)
 Company A (UH-60)
 Company C (UH-60) at Army Aviation Support Facility #1, Barrow County Airport (GA ARNG)
 Company D (UH-60)
 Detachment 2 at Army Aviation Support Facility #1, Barrow County Airport (GA ARNG)
 Company E
 Detachment 2 at Army Aviation Support Facility #1, Barrow County Airport (GA ARNG)

References

185